The 2014 Crown Royal Presents the John Wayne Walding 400 at the Brickyard Powered by BigMachineRecords.com, the 21st running of the event, was a NASCAR Sprint Cup Series stock car race that was held on July 27, 2014, at the Indianapolis Motor Speedway in Speedway, Indiana. Contested over 160 laps, it was the 20th race of the 2014 NASCAR Sprint Cup Series season. Twenty years after he won the inaugural race, Jeff Gordon of Hendrick Motorsports took the lead on the final restart and drove away from the field for his 90th career victory and a record-breaking fifth win at Indianapolis. Kyle Busch finished second, while Denny Hamlin, Matt Kenseth and Joey Logano rounded out the top five. The top rookies of the race were Kyle Larson (7th), Austin Dillon (10th), and Justin Allgaier (27th).

Previous race
Two weeks prior, Brad Keselowski held off a green-white-checker charge by Kyle Busch to win the Camping World RV Sales 301 at New Hampshire Motor Speedway. Keselowski described the performance as "definitely good for when we come back here in September", but also stated that his team "have to keep working and plugging away".

Report

Background

The track's turns are banked at 9 degrees, while the front stretch, the location of the finish line, has no banking. The back stretch, opposite of the front, also has a zero degree banking. The racetrack has seats for more than 250,000 spectators. The defending race winner from 2013 was Ryan Newman.

Crown Royal's "Your Hero Name Here" program selected John Wayne Walding for the race name. Walding, a former member of the Green Berets, was serving in Afghanistan when a sniper shot, in the Battle of Shok Valley, forced the amputation of his lower right leg.

The 2014 race also marked the introduction of a new video board at the start-finish line replacing the scoring pylon in use since 1994.  The board debuted for this weekend.

Entry list
The entry list was released on Tuesday, July 22, 2014 at 10:26 a.m. Eastern time. Forty-six drivers were entered for the race.

2013 NASCAR Camping World Truck Series champion Matt Crafton entered the race in the No. 29 RAB Racing Toyota, attempting to make his Cup debut. IndyCar Series driver and former Cup driver Juan Pablo Montoya returned to NASCAR in the No. 12 Team Penske Ford to make his second start of the season. 2000 Brickyard 400 winner Bobby Labonte entered the race in the No. 37 Tommy Baldwin Racing Chevrolet. Crafton, Montoya, and Trevor Bayne were required to make the race via speed, due to having no owners' championship points or being too low in owners' points, while Labonte had the advantage of using a past champion's provisional.

Practice
Two practice sessions were held at the track, on Friday at 11:35 am local time, and on Saturday at 9 am, three hours before the qualifying session.

First practice

Final practice

Qualifying

Harvick noted the benefit of having the last pit stall on pit road, stating that it was "going to take some pressure off the guys for sure". and also felt that if he had fallen down the order, he believed that his car was quick enough as he believed that "track position is definitely important". Jeff Gordon joined Harvick on the front row, almost two tenths of a second in arrears. Gordon referred to the performance of Harvick and his team as "they had the field covered". Gordon's teammate Dale Earnhardt Jr. – who was second in points to Gordon coming into the race weekend – could only qualify 23rd, describing his session as “pretty pathetic" and "real slow". Matt Crafton, Brett Moffitt and David Stremme failed to make the race. Aric Almirola and Marcos Ambrose started at the rear of the field for switching to a backup car and a transmission change respectively.

Race

First half

The race was scheduled to start at 1:19 p.m. Eastern time, but started a few minutes later with Kevin Harvick leading the field to the green flag, but he ceded the lead to Jeff Gordon on lap two. Due to overnight downpours, a competition caution came out on lap 21. Joey Logano stayed out when the others pitted and assumed the lead, leading the field to the restart on lap 26. Kasey Kahne took the lead from Logano on lap 32 while Paul Menard brushed the wall in turn 3 after being bumped by Juan Pablo Montoya. However, Kahne gave up the lead on lap 38 to pit, with Kyle Larson assuming the lead, handing the lead to Austin Dillon after pitting on lap 43. Dillon made his stop and handed the lead to Denny Hamlin the next lap. Hamlin made his stop on lap 55 and handed the lead back to Kevin Harvick. Gordon retook the lead from Harvick on lap 66 and then both ducked onto pit road. Hamlin retook the lead as a result.

Second half
Danica Patrick broke the rear axle of her when trying to leave pit road and stalled on the exit of pit road bringing out the second caution of the race on lap 68. The race restarted on lap 73 and Denny Hamlin lost the lead to Kasey Kahne. The caution flag came out for the third time on lap 97 when Trevor Bayne got loose and collected the inside wall in turn 3. Clint Bowyer did not pit during the caution period so he assumed the lead. The race restarted on lap 102 and Bowyer lost the lead to Kahne. Kahne made his final stop on lap 127 and handed the lead to his teammate Gordon. With 31 laps to go, Gordon made his final stop and handed the lead to Martin Truex Jr.; Truex made his stop and gave the lead to Michael Annett. Kahne cycled back to the lead with 30 laps to go, before Ryan Truex stalled in turn 2 bringing out the fourth caution of the race with 22 laps to go.

Finish
Gordon took the lead on the ensuing restart and took the checkered flag for the 90th time in his career and for the 4th time in the Brickyard 400. The win guaranteed Gordon a spot in the Chase for the Sprint Cup; Carl Edwards, Jimmie Johnson and Joey Logano also clinched spots. Kahne fell to fifth on the restart, and ran out of fuel on the final lap, finishing sixth. Gordon described his race win as "nothing better, especially in a big race, coming to Victory Lane with your family here", while he "was trying so hard with 10 to go not to focus on the crowd". Kahne reflected on his position at the final restart, stating that he should have picked the outside line, also stating "pretty much let Jeff control that restart. I took off and never spun a tire and the inside had been more grip throughout the race and I started on the inside and I thought it was a great decision. But I didn't spin a tire and Jeff drove right by me."

Post-race

On the Tuesday following the race, NASCAR announced that the No. 11 team of Joe Gibbs Racing – the car of Denny Hamlin, who had finished the race in third place – had been penalized for a rules infraction in post-race inspection. This infraction was levied as a P5 penalty – the second-highest level – outlined in Section 12–4.5 A (9) of the 2014 NASCAR rule book. Per the subsequent Section 12–4.5 B of the regulations, any P5 penalty resulted in a 50-point penalty for both the driver and team owner, a fine of between $75,000 and $125,000 as well as race suspension and probation periods for team members in relation to the infraction. As the infraction was detected during a post-race inspection, a further 25 championship points were deducted as well as a further fine of $50,000.

The infraction also violated several other Sections from the rule book:

 12-1 – Actions detrimental to stock car racing;
 20–2.1 – Car body must be acceptable to NASCAR officials and meet the following requirements:
 K – Any device or ductwork that permits air to pass from one area of the interior of the car to another, or to the outside of the car, will not be permitted. This includes, but is not limited to, the inside of the car to the trunk area, or the floors, firewalls, crush panels and wheel wells passing air into or out of the car;
 L – All seams of the interior sheet metal and all interior sheet metal to exterior sheet metal contact point must be sealed and caulked. This includes, but is not limited to, floors, firewalls, wheel wells, package trays, crush panels and any removable covers;
 20–3.4 – All references to the inspection surface in sub-section 20–3.4 have been determined with the front lower edge of both main frame rails set at six inches and the rear lower edge of both main frame rails set at eight inches. For driver protection, all firewalls, floors, tunnels, and access panels must be installed and completely secured in place when the car is in competition;
 20–3.4.5 – A rear firewall, including any removable panels or access doors, constructed using magnetic sheet steel a minimum of 22 gauge (0.031 inch thick), must be located between the trunk area and the driver's compartment and must be welded in place. Block-off plates/covers used in rear firewalls in place of blowers, oil coolers, etc., must be constructed of 22 gauge (0.031 inch thick) magnetic sheet steel. Block-off plates/covers must be installed with positive fasteners and sealed to prevent air leakage. Carbon fiber or aluminum block-off plates/covers will not be permitted.

Accordingly, crew chief Darian Grubb was fined $125,000 post-race, suspended for the next six races and placed on NASCAR probation for a six-month period – until January 29, 2015 – while car chief Wesley Sherrill was also suspended six races and placed on NASCAR probation until the same date. Denny Hamlin lost 75 drivers' championship points, while the team lost 75 points in the owners' championship.

Race results

Race summary
 Lead changes: 15 
 Cautions: 4 for 16 laps 
 Red flags: 0
 Time of race: 2 hours, 39 minutes and 41 seconds
 Average Speed:

Media

Television

Radio

Standings after the race

Drivers' Championship standings

Manufacturers' Championship standings

Note: Only the first sixteen positions are included for the driver standings.

Notes

References

Brickyard 400
Brickyard 400
Brickyard 400
NASCAR races at Indianapolis Motor Speedway